Diana Dowek (born January 1, 1942) is a visual artist, known for one of her first series, denoting her engagement in human rights movements. Dowek also was a founder of the Association of Visual Artists of the Republic of Argentina (AVARA) and is now a Vice President.

Biography 
Diana Dowek was born in Buenos Aires, Argentina on January 1, 1942. She has been labeled a Postwar and Contemporary Artist. It is worth mentioning that in 1975, Dowek experienced a huge change in her life; the coup that overturned the Argentinian President. Some sources do, however, note that this event as well as the Vietnam war is what led Diana Dowek to her activist movements, seeing as she experienced so much terrorism.

In 1964, Diana Dowek would settle down and marry her husband before moving to Italy. While they did enjoy the life they lived out in the country, it only took a year before they felt homesick, thus packing up once again and returning to Argentina. From that point on, they have stayed in Argentina ever since.

Diana Dowek would go through some turning point events, such as a coup d'etat that was planned in order to overthrow the President Isabel Perón, leaving the government to be led by a military junta. Due to this horrific event, Argentina would mark this time period as "Argentina's Dirty War"; a period that included terrorism and socialistic riots. This event could be compared to the predecessor, French Reign of Terror period, since similar in some events. This "Dirty War" had ended with 30,000 people disappearing by the year 1983.

Education 
Sources indicate that Diana Dowek first entered Escuela de Bellas Artes Manuel Belgrano in Buenos Aires (roughly translated to the Manuel Belgrano School of Fine Arts) at the ripe age of thirteen before she later enrolled in a similar school,  Escuela Nacional de Bellas Artes Prilidiano Pueyrredón (National Fine Arts). Both schools were within her general vicinity of Buenos Aires. While in attendance at Escuela Nacional de Bellas Artes Prilidiano Pueyrredón, Dowek demanded educational reform alongside other members of the student movement, protesting the active militance opposition that so many of her colleagues were up against. During these years, she would make connections and build what could be described as friendships with other important figures, such as Horacion Safons and Margarita Paska, eventually forming an "active cohort among Buenos Aires' artistic avant-gardes" in other words, they would form a power group.

Activism 
During her time in school, Diana Dowek's early work all portrayed her political stance, and most importantly her attempts at raising awareness of social issues and struggles during President Isabel Perón's reign. Dowek was known to have a unique style that led to a number of metaphors being iterated, resulting in over fifty paintings that would document urban uprisings. One of the most known paintings that conveyed these terroristic events would be Paisaje con retrovisor II.

Dowek was engaged in a Post-War movement, promoting human rights and raising awareness. It is known that Ford Falcon cars became a common subject in her painting due to the disappearance of persons in 1983, owed to police often abducting people with unlicensed Falcons.

Selected artwork

Paisaje con retrovisor II, 1975 
Also known as (Landscape with side view mirror II), this painting is part of a miniseries that became an addition to the Collection of Dr. José Abadi. In an LA Times article, this piece was denoted as one of the most startling works in the exhibit, which can be owed to the still bodies in the car's rearview mirror. The world within this painting seems to be dystopic, and with further investigation, it is revealed that this painting was owed to the coup d'etat that had earlier changed the life of Dowek.

Exhibitions 

 1968 Galeria Lirolay, Bueno Aires
 1985 Pintado en Argentina, Museo Eduardo Sivori, Centro Cultural de Buenos Aires
 1996 Zana Catástrofe: El poder vulnerable, Fundación Federico Klemm, Buenos Aires
 2001 Diana Dowek: Exposición retrospectiva, 1972, Museo Nacional de Bellas Artes, Buenos Aires
 2003 Ansia y Devoción. Imágenes del Presente, Fundación PROA, Buenos Aires
 2006 Memoria en Construccion, Centro Cultural Recoleta, Buenos Aires
 2013 La pictura es un campo de batalia, Museo Nacional de Bellas Artes, Neuquén, Argentina
 2015 Galeria Jacques Martínez, Buenos Aires, Argentina
 2018 Radical Women Latin American Art, 1960–1985, Brooklyn-New York, New York Brooklyn Museum

Collections 
 Pausa, 2003. Mixed Media.
 Pausa En La Larga Marcha, 2003.
 From the Depth of the Earth

Honors and awards 
2012 Merit Diploma Konex Award for his work in the last decade
2011 First prize of painting Bank Central of the Republic Argentina Museum Numismatic BsAs receives the grant Pollock - Krasner Foundation for the edition of a book about his work

2010 Margarita Ponce UMA Award for contribution of gender to fine arts
2008-09 First Municipal Prize for painting Manuel Belgrano Museum E. Sivori
2008 Third prize in painting Banco Nación Centro Cultural Borges Bs. As.
2005 First prize Ibero-American painting, Centro Cultural Borges, Buenos Aires
2004 Second prize of painting Salon Manuel Belgrano, Museum Sivori Buenos Aires
2003 Prize second prize, Ibero-American competition, Museo Nacional de Bellas Artes, Buenos Aires
2002 premio Leonardo the artist of the year National Museum of fine arts
1999 scholarship to creation, National Endowment for the arts,
1997 first prize painting ProArte Museo Provincial de Bellas Artes, Córdoba
1995 grant Pollock-Krasner Foundation, New York, USA
Award to the artist of the year 1994, given by the International Association of critics of art, Argentine section
1979 special mention of drawing, Premi de Dibuix Joan Miró Barcelona Spai

Bibliography 
https://asuntoimpreso.com/asuntoimpresoediciones/noticias/diana-dowek-la-pintura-es-un-campo-de-batalla-114
https://hammer.ucla.edu/radical-women/artists/diana-dowek/
https://art-list.online/diana-dowek/
https://www.mutualart.com/Exhibition/Radical-Women-Latin-American-Art--1960-1/051FEBB34A3FC96D
Diana Dowek: La pictura es un campo de batalia; Obras, intervenciones, 1967-2012. Buenos Aires: Asunto Impreso, 2013.
https://www.pkf-imagecollection.org/artist/Diana_Dowek/works/
http://www.telam.com.ar/notas/201706/192466-la-artista-diana-dowek-exhibe-pinturas-inspiradas-en-el-conflicto-sirio.html

References

External links 
 https://www.judischekulturbund.com/argentina/

Living people
1942 births
20th-century Argentine women artists
21st-century Argentine women artists
Artists from Buenos Aires